Ishikawajima could refer to:
IHI Corporation, formerly known as Ishikawajima-Harima Heavy Industries
Ishikawajima Aircraft Company Limited
Ishikawajima Motorcar Manufacturing Company (currently Isuzu Motors)